HARNET (Hong Kong Academic and Research Network) is the wide area network that links up the campus networks of the eight tertiary institutions in Hong Kong.

It was founded in 1991 or 1992. Its goal is to facilitate information sharing among academic libraries. It is primarily operated by the University of Hong Kong.

References

External links
 HARNET - The Hong Kong Academic and Research NETwork 

Internet in Hong Kong
National research and education networks
Telecommunications in Hong Kong
University of Hong Kong
1991 establishments in Hong Kong